The 1995 Preston Borough Council election for the Preston Borough Council was held in May 1995.  One third of the council was up for election.

Ashton

Avenham

Brookfield

Cadley

Central

Deepdale

Fishwick

Greyfriars

Ingol

Larches

Moor Park

Preston Rural East

Preston Rural West

Ribbleton

Riversway

Sharoe Green

Sherwood

St Matthews

Tulketh

References

1995 English local elections
1995
1990s in Lancashire